The Himalayan monal (Lophophorus impejanus), also called Impeyan monal and Impeyan pheasant, is a pheasant native to Himalayan forests and shrublands at elevations of . It is part of the family Phasianidae and is listed as Least Concern on the IUCN Red List.
It is the national bird of Nepal, where it is known as the danphe or danfe, and state bird of Uttarakhand, India, where it is known as monal.
The scientific name commemorates Lady Mary Impey, the wife of the British chief justice of Bengal, Sir Elijah Impey.

Description 

It is a relatively large-sized pheasant. The adult male has multicoloured plumage throughout, while the female, as in other pheasants, is more subdued in colour. Notable features in the male include a long, metallic green crest, coppery feathers on the back and neck, and a prominent white rump that is most visible when the bird is in flight. The tail feathers of the male are uniformly rufous, becoming darker towards the tips, whereas the lower tail coverts of females are white, barred with black and red. The female has a prominent white patch on the throat and a white strip on the tail. The first-year male and the juvenile resemble the female, but the first-year male is larger and the juvenile is less distinctly marked.

Distribution and habitat 

The Himalayan monal's native range extends from Afghanistan and Pakistan through the Himalayas in India, Nepal, southern Tibet and Bhutan.
In Pakistan, it is most common in the Khyber Pakhtunkhwa province and has also been recorded in Kaghan, Palas Valley and Azad Kashmir. In India, it has been recorded throughout the Indian Himalayan Region from Jammu and Kashmir to Arunachal Pradesh.
It tolerates snow and digs through it to obtain plant roots and invertebrate prey.

Behaviour and ecology 

The diet of the Himalayan monal consists primarily of tubers, nuts, tender leaves, shoots, insects and other invertebrates. It digs in snow for shoots and invertebrates. Plant matter made up a large part of the diet, although invertebrate matter was also present in low percentages.

Conservation
In some areas, the Himalayan monal is threatened due to poaching and other anthropogenic factors. In the western Himalayas, the population responded negatively to human disturbance involving hydroelectric power development. It is not considered endangered in Pakistan and can be easily located. In some areas, the population density of the species is as high as five pairs per square mile. The main threat to the species is poaching, as the crest is valuable. It is thought to bring status to its wearer and is a symbol of authority.

References

External links 

 BirdLife Species Factsheet
 Galliforms and Pheasants

Himalayan monal
Birds of Pakistan
Birds of North India
Birds of the Himalayas
Birds of Nepal
Symbols of Uttarakhand
Birds of Tibet
National symbols of Nepal
Himalayan monal
Birds of Myanmar